The World Group II was the second highest level of Fed Cup competition in 2005. Winning nations advanced to the World Group Play-offs, and the losing nations were demoted to the World Group II Play-offs.

Switzerland vs. Slovakia

Germany vs. Indonesia

Thailand vs. Croatia

Czech Republic vs. Japan

References

See also
Fed Cup structure

World Group II